Alvimia is a Brazilian genus of bamboo in the grass family. It is native to the eastern coastal regions of the State of Bahia in eastern  Brazil.

Species
 Alvimia auriculata Soderstr. & Londoño 
 Alvimia gracilis Soderstr. & Londoño  
 Alvimia lancifolia Soderstr. & Londoño

See also
List of Poaceae genera

References

Bambusoideae genera
Endemic flora of Brazil
Grasses of Brazil
Flora of Bahia
Bambusoideae